Elaiyur (East) is a village in the Udayarpalayam taluk of Ariyalur district, Tamil Nadu, India.

Demographics 
At the 2001 census, Elaiyur (East) had a population of 5,443 (2,657 males and 2,786 females).

One of the famous festival in Elaiyur Selliyammen Koil Festival

References 

Villages in Ariyalur district